Appalshop is a media, arts, and education center located in Whitesburg, Kentucky, in the heart of the southern Appalachian region of the United States.

History 
Appalshop was founded in 1969 as the Appalachian Film Workshop, a project of the United States government's War on Poverty. The organization was one of ten Community Film Workshops started by a partnership between the federal Office of Economic Opportunity and the American Film Institute.  In 1974 the worker-operated organization evolved into a nonprofit company called Appalshop and established itself as a hub of filmmaking in Appalachia, and since that time has produced more than one hundred films, covering such subjects as coal mining, the environment, traditional culture, and the economy.  The name was officially changed to reflect changing business structure and goals.

Appalshop also produces theater, music, and spoken-word recordings (released on its June Appal Recordings label), as well as photography, multimedia, and books.

Since 1985, Appalshop has also operated WMMT-FM (Mountain Community Radio), a radio station located in Whitesburg, Kentucky which serves much of central Appalachia (including portions of eastern Kentucky, southwest Virginia, and western West Virginia) with music and programming relevant to the region and its culture.  WMMT also broadcasts live on the web.

Mission 
As stated on its website, Appalshop's goals are:

To document, disseminate, and revitalize the lasting traditions and contemporary creativity of Appalachia;
To tell stories the commercial cultural industries don't tell, challenging stereotypes with Appalachian voices and visions;
To support communities' efforts to achieve justice and equity and solve their own problems in their own ways;
To celebrate cultural diversity as a positive social value; and
To participate in regional, national, and global dialogue toward these ends.

Related grants and funding

Appalshop funding 
Appalshop relies on multiple funding sources, including endowments, individual donors, and public and private grants.  In 2017 Appalshop reported that its funding comprised 10% from endowment, 5% from individual donors, 32% from public grants, 45% from private grants and 8% from other sources.

Grants

National Endowment for Humanities 
National Endowment for Humanities Grants have awarded multiple grants to Appalshop.  These include $100,000 to improve the public programming initiatives and access to their collections.  The National Endowment of the Humanities stated that the grant would be an ideal for this region because of thousands coal related layoffs in the region.

ArtPlace America Grant 
In July 2015 Appalshop was awarded $450,000 by ArtPlace America, which provided funding for increasing arts and technology training.  The money also helped to diversify Letcher County's economy.

Economic Development Administration and Appalachian Regional Commission Grants 
These grants were awarded to the Southeast Kentucky High Tech Workforce Project that was started by Appalshop.  The totaled amount of money awarded was $275,000. Economic Development Administration awarded $200,000 and Appalachian Regional Commission awarded $75,000.  The grants will help develop a certificate program at Southeast Kentucky Community & Technical College campuses in Letcher that will focuses on information technology and media production.

Awards
In 1990 Appalshop won the Alfred I. du Pont Award for Broadcast Journalism (Columbia University)

See also
June Appal Recordings
WMMT (FM)

References

Bibliography

 
 Appalachian Film Workshop/Appalshop Films collection, 1969–Present - Kentucky Digital Library
 Hoffman, Carl (1996) "The Voice of the Mountains" in Appalachia Magazine a publication of the Appalachian Regional Commission
 Ruby, Jay (1991) "Speaking For, Speaking About, Speaking With, or Speaking Alongside- An Anthropological and Documentary Dilemma" in Visual Anthropology Review Fall 1991 Volume 7 Number 2

External links
Appalshop official site
WMMT official site
Article about Appalshop at 40 years old
Article about the founding of Appalshop by Bill Richardson
Appalshop in the American Archive of Public Broadcasting

Appalachian culture in Kentucky
Buildings and structures in Letcher County, Kentucky
Arts centers in Kentucky
Education in Letcher County, Kentucky
Tourist attractions in Letcher County, Kentucky
Non-profit organizations based in Kentucky
1969 establishments in Kentucky
Whitesburg, Kentucky